The Swiss National Time Trial Championship is a road bicycle race that takes place inside the Swiss National Cycling Championship, and decides the best cyclist in this type of race. The first winner was Viktor Kunz in 1993. Fabian Cancellara made the remarkable achievement of 10 wins between 2002 and 2014. The women's record is held by Karin Thürig with 7 wins.

Multiple winners

Men

Women

Men

Elite

U23

Women

Elite

References

External links
Past winners on cyclingarchives.com

National road cycling championships
Cycle races in Switzerland
Recurring sporting events established in 1993
1993 establishments in Switzerland